The 1982 West Georgia Braves football team was an American football team that represented West Georgia College (now known as the University of West Georgia) as an independent during the 1982 NCAA Division III football season. In their second season under head coach Bobby Pate, the Braves compiled a 12–0 record and won the NCAA Division III championship.

During its undefeated regular season, the team scored an average of 42.1 points per game while holding opponents to 4.6 points per game. The season included a Sunday afternoon game against  intended to fill the void for television viewers during the 1982 NFL strike.

In the postseason, West Georgia faced  in the Division III South Region Championship game. Widener had spoiled West Georgia's undefeated 1981 season in that year's playoffs. West Georgia prevailed in the rematch by a 31–24 score.  West Georgia then went on to shut out , 14–0, in the Amos Alonzo Stagg Bowl to win the Division III national championship.

The team played its home games at Grisham Stadium in Carrollton, Georgia.

Schedule

References

West Georgia
West Georgia Wolves football seasons
NCAA Division III Football Champions
West Georgia Braves football
College football undefeated seasons